Apolinar Serrano (July 23, 1833 - June 15, 1876) was a Spanish bishop of Havana.

He was born in Villarramiel, Spain. Buried in Havana Cathedral. His grave statue is a work by the Italian sculptor Pietro Costa.

References

1833 births
1876 deaths
Spanish Roman Catholic bishops in North America
People from the Province of Palencia
People from Havana